Wiebenville Aerodrome  is located in Kenora District Ontario, Canada about  south of Opapimiskan Lake Airport.

References

Registered aerodromes in Kenora District